National Tertiary Route 309, or just Route 309 (or ) is a National Road Route of Costa Rica, located in the San José province.

Description
In San José province the route covers Vázquez de Coronado canton (Dulce Nombre de Jesús district), Moravia canton (San Jerónimo district).

References

Highways in Costa Rica